The 1998–99 Liga Femenina de Baloncesto was the 37th edition of Spain's premier championship for women's basketball clubs. Defending champion Celta Vigo defeated CB Islas Canarias in the play-off's final to win its fifth title. CD Ensino and Ros Casares Valencia also reached the play-offs. On the other hand, CB Tres Cantos and Baloncesto Alcalá were relegated as the bottom teams.

Teams by autonomous community

Regular season

Championship play-offs

Semifinals

Final

References

Liga Femenina de Baloncesto seasons
Femenina
Spain